Palpita paulianalis is a moth in the family Crambidae. It is found in Madagascar.

References

Palpita
Moths described in 1956
Moths of Madagascar